FC Luch Minsk was a Belarusian football club based in Minsk.

History
Luch was playing in lower Belarusian SSR leagues from 1987 to 1991 and spent one season in Belarusian First League in 1992. After the end of the season they disbanded.

Another club, unrelated to the old one, also named Luch Minsk, was founded in 2012.

References

External links
Profile at footballfacts.ru

Defunct football clubs in Belarus
Football clubs in Minsk
Association football clubs established in 1983
1983 establishments in Belarus
1992 disestablishments in Belarus
Association football clubs disestablished in 1992